| leader_title3            = 
| leader_name3             = Solukhumbu 1(B) Buddhi Kumar Rajbhandari {{#if:NCP|(NCP)}}
| area_magnitude           = 
| area_footnotes           = 
| area_total_km2           = 565.06
| area_note                = 
| area_rank                = 
| elevation_footnotes      = 
| elevation_m              = 
| elevation_min_m          = 
| elevation_max_m          = 
| population_footnotes     = 
| population_total         = 24323
| population_as_of         = 2011
| population_density_km2   = auto
| population_note          = 
| population_rank          = 
| population_blank1_title  = Households
| population_blank1        = 
| timezone1                = NPT
| utc_offset1              = +05:45
| postal_code_type         = Postal Codes
| postal_code              = 
| area_code_type           = Telephone Code
| area_code                = 
| website                  = 
| footnotes                = 
}}
Solududhkunda (earlier:Dudhkunda) is the only municipality of Solukhumbu District. Located in Province No. 1 of Nepal.   The town of Salleri, which is located within the municipality is the headquarter of Solukhumbu District It was formed in 2014 by merging four VDCs: Salleri, Garma, Loding Tamakhani and Beni and was divided into 9 wards. Total area of the municipality had  and population of municipality had 20,399 individuals living in 5,368 households (2011 Nepal census).

In March 2017, restructuring of local level units in Nepal brought some changing in area and population. More VDCs added to the municipality: Takasindu, Kerung, Gorakhani and Tapting.

Tingla VDC was added again to this municipality on 26 February 2018 and finally the total area of this municipality became  and population became 24,323 people.

Etymology
Solududhkunda is a combination of two words "Solu" and "Dudhkunda". "Solu" is a river which flows in this region and "Dudhkunda" is a lake located east of Solu river. The municipality has gain her name on river and lake which are famous in this region.

Salleri
Salleri is the main town or centre of Solududhkunda Municipality. It was a separate local level rural unit before 2014. According to the 2011 Nepal census it had total population of 6,590 individuals living in 1,682 households.

Salleri is now divided into three wards. Ward no. 4, 5 and 6 of Solududhkunda Municipality were part of Salleri Village development committee. Headquarters of Solududhkunda municipality is situated at ward no. 5.

Media 
To promote local culture, Solududhkunda Municipality has two community radio stations Radio Dudhkoshi (94.6 MHz) and Solu FM (101.2 MHz) and Himal FM.

Transportation
Most parts of Dudhkunda municipality have access to local roads. Phaplu Airport is located in Phaplu in the northern part of the municipality.

References

External links
Official website of Solududhkunda municipality
District Corrected Last for RAJAPATRA
Details of the local level bodies

Populated places in Solukhumbu District
Municipalities in Koshi Province
Nepal municipalities established in 2014
Municipalities in Solukhumbu District